Charlotte Morkken (born 16 May 1992), is a Norwegian team handball player. She played for the club Thames Handball Club. She was mentioned as a key player in 2013, when the club played in London against a top team of Hungarian handball players and won.  She participated in the  2014/15 Women's EHF Challenge Cup Round 3  where she was listed among the top 50 goal scorers of the round.

References

Norwegian female handball players
1992 births
Living people